Horton may refer to:

Places

Antarctica 
 Horton Glacier, Adelaide Island, Antarctica
 Horton Ledge, Queen Elizabeth Land, Antarctica

Australia 

 Horton, Queensland, a town and locality in the Bundaberg Region
 Horton River (Australia), in northern New South Wales

Canada 
 Horton, Ontario, a township
 Horton River (Canada), a tributary of the Beaufort Sea
 Horton Township, Nova Scotia, an 18th-century township; see Wolfville

United Kingdom 
 Horton Beach, Port Eynon Bay, Wales
 Horton, Berkshire, a village and civil parish
 Horton, Buckinghamshire, a hamlet of Ivinghoe
 Horton or Horton by Malpas, Cheshire, a village and former civil parish
 Horton, Dorset, a village and civil parish
 Horton Priory, its ruined religious house upon which the parish church was built
 Horton, Gloucestershire, a village
 Horton, Lancashire, a village and civil parish
 Horton, Northamptonshire, a village
 Horton, Blyth, Northumberland, a village
 Horton, Chatton, a pair of small settlements: West Horton and East Horton, Northumberland
 Horton, Hadley, a location in Shropshire
 Horton, Wem, a location in Shropshire
 Horton, Somerset, a village and civil parish
 Horton, Staffordshire, a village and civil parish
 Horton, Swansea, a village
 Horton, Wiltshire, a hamlet/locality in Bishops Cannings
 Great Horton, Bradford, West Yorkshire
 Horton, Surrey, a semi-rural area in the west of Epsom, Surrey
 Horton Country Park, a local nature reserve
 Horton in Ribblesdale, North Yorkshire
 Horton Park, Bradford, West Yorkshire, a public park
 Horton-cum-Studley, Oxfordshire, near Oakley, Buckinghamshire
 Little Horton, Bradford, West Yorkshire

United States 
 Horton, Alabama, an unincorporated town
 Horton, Howell County, Missouri, an unincorporated community
 Horton, Kansas, a city
 Horton, Minnesota, an unincorporated community
 Horton, Oregon, an unincorporated community
 Horton, Vernon County, Missouri, an unincorporated community
Horton, Iowa, an unincorporated community
 Horton, West Virginia, an unincorporated community
 Horton Creek (Arizona)
 Horton Park (Saint Paul, Minnesota), a small arboretum
 Horton Peak, White Cloud Mountains, Idaho
 Horton Town, Missouri, an unincorporated community in Washington County
 Horton Township (disambiguation)

Elsewhere 
 21527 Horton, an asteroid
 Horton Plains, Sri Lanka, see Horton Plains National Park

People and fictional characters 
 Horton (given name)
 Horton (surname)

Historic structures
 Horton Gristmill, Malone, New York, on the National Register of Historic Places
 Horton House, Jekyll Island, Georgia, on the US National Register of Historic Places

Hospitals
 Horton General Hospital, a National Health Service-run hospital, Banbury, Oxfordshire, England
 Horton Hospital, a large psychiatric hospital in Epsom, Surrey, England, which closed in 1997

Other uses
 Horton baronets, an extinct title in the Baronetage of Great Britain
 Horton Fieldhouse, an indoor athletics facility on the campus of Illinois State University in Normal, Illinois
 Horton Light Railway, Surrey, England

See also 

 Horton's syndrome, also known as cluster headache
 Hawton
 Hortonia (disambiguation)
 Hortonville (disambiguation)